Liu Kuan-ting (born November 11, 1988) is a Taiwanese actor. He received the Golden Bell Award for Best Supporting Actor for the hit drama series A Boy Named Flora A (2017). In 2019, he won Best Supporting Actor at the 56th Golden Horse Awards for the film A Sun.

He participated in the HBO Asia TV series Trinity of Shadows which comprises 15 one-hour episodes, as a rookie policeman. It premiered on June 13, 2021 and played on HBO Go and HBO in Asia.

Selected filmography

Television series

Film

Music video appearances

Awards and nominations

References

External links 

 
 

1988 births
Living people
21st-century Taiwanese male actors
Taiwanese male film actors
Taiwanese male television actors
National Taiwan University of Arts alumni
People from Pingtung County
Taiwanese male stage actors